Yuk Hui is a Hong Kong philosopher and university professor. He is known for his writings on philosophy and technology. Hui has been described as one of the most interesting contemporary philosophers of technology.

Education
Hui studied Computer Engineering at the University of Hong Kong, wrote his doctoral thesis under the French philosopher Bernard Stiegler at Goldsmiths College in London and obtained his Habilitation in philosophy of technology from Leuphana University in Germany.

Career
Hui has taught at the Leuphana University, Bauhaus University, and has been a visiting professor at the China Academy of Art. He has been the convenor of the Research Network for Philosophy and Technology since 2014 and sits as a juror of the Berggruen Prize for Philosophy and Culture since 2020. He currently teaches at the City University of Hong Kong.

Influence and concepts 

Hui works on the intersection between technology and philosophy. His first monograph titled On the Existence of Digital Objects (2016), an homage to the work of Gilbert Simondon, was prefaced by Bernard Stiegler. The book was endorsed by Jahrbuch Technikphilosophie as having "all the qualities of becoming a genuine classic in the future." Hui's second book The Question Concerning Technology in China. An Essay in Cosmotechnics (2016) is a response to Martin Heidegger's 1953 essay "The Question Concerning Technology". Hui questioned that the concept of technology in Western philosophy literature may not coincide with that of China and therefore suggested reconstructing a technological thought in China. The American philosopher of technology Carl Mitcham in a review of Hui's book writes "There is no more challenging work for anyone interested in trying to understand both the manifold philosophical challenges of Western scientific technology and the contemporary rise of China on the world-historical scene."

Hui's third monograph Recursivity and Contingency (2019) is a philosophical treatise of cybernetics. The Philosophical Quarterly in its review states that "Despite the historical span of roughly 250 years, the diverse range of authors, disciplines and underlying problems, Recursivity and Contingency is held together firmly by its two eponymous concepts." The professor Bruce Clarke in his review for the American Book Review states that "Recursivity and Contingency submits cybernetics to a massive genealogical reading grounded in German idealism and Naturphilosphie, demonstrating its deepest roots in the "organic condition of philosophizing" since Immanuel Kant, which has developed the concept of the organic in a way that subordinates the phenomenon of technicity to a more general definition of organism." Hui continues his work on recursivity in a sequel titled Art and Cosmotechnics (2021). Hui's anthology Fragmentar el futuro, assembling his writings on politics and technology, was published in 2020 in both Portuguese and Spanish. It has received many reviews and endorsements in  Latin America. The Spanish newspaper El Mundo described him as a "new superstar of thought."

Hui is most known for his concept of technodiversity and cosmotechnics, which is based on what he calls the antinomy of the universality of technology. The intention is to diverge away from the conception of a universal science and technology which came out of Western modernity and escalated on a global scale today. Hui proposes to rediscover the history of technodiversity to cultivate different conceptions of technology through diverse forms of thinking and practice in order to invent alternatives. He calls on others to contribute to the project of cultivating technodiversity through an investigation of technological thought through different epistemologies to open to a diversification of technologies in our modern world. The journal Angelaki (vol. 25 issue 4, 2020) and Ellul Forum (Issue 68, 2021) dedicated a special issue on Hui's concept of cosmotechnics.

Bibliography

Monographs 

On the Existence of Digital Objects, pref. Bernard Stiegler, University of Minnesota Press, 2016. 
 论数码物的存在, trans. Wannan Li (李婉楠), Shanghai: Shanghai People's Publishing House, 2019.  (Chinese)
 디지털적 대상의 존재에 대하여, trans. 조형준, 이철규, 임완철, Seoul: 새물결, 2021.  (Korean)
The Question Concerning Technology in China: An Essay in Cosmotechnics, Falmouth: Urbanomic, 2017.
 중국에서의 기술에 관한 물음, trans. Hyung-Joon Jo, 새물결, 2019.  (Korean)
 Die Frage nach der Technik in China. Ein Essay über die Kosmotechnik, trans. David Frühauf, Berlin: Matthes und Seitz, 2020.  (German)
 La Question de la technique en Chine, pref. Junius Frey, trans. Alex Taillard, Paris: Éditions Divergences, 2021.  (French)
 Cosmotecnica. La Question della Tecnologia in Cina, trans. Sara Baranzoni, Rome: Produzioni Nero, 2021.   (Italian)
 论中国的技术问题—宇宙技术初论, trans. 卢睿洋, 苏子滢, Hangzhou: China Academy of Art, 2021.  (Chinese)
 中国における技術への問い──宇宙技芸試論, trans. Kohei Ise, Tokyo: Genron, 2022. ISBN：9784907188467 (Japanese)
 Вопрос о технике в Китае, trans. Денис Шалагинов, Moscow: Ad Marginem, 2023. ISBN 9785911036379 (Russian)
Recursivity and Contingency, pref. Howard Caygill, London: Rowman and Littlefield, 2019.
 Рекурсивность и контингентность, trans. Dmitry Kralechkin, Moscow: V-A-C, 2020.  (Russian)
 递归与偶然, trans. 苏子滢, Shanghai: East China Normal University Press, 2020.  (Chinese)
 再帰性と偶然性, trans. 原島大輔, Tokyo: Seidosha, 2022.  (Japanese)
 Rekursywność I Przygodność, trans. Joanna Bednarek, Katowice: University of Silesia, 2022.  (Polish)
 Recursividad y Contingencia, trans. Maximiliano Gonnet, Buenos Aires: Caja Negra Editora, 2022.  (Spanish)
Art and Cosmotechnics, Minneapolis: University of Minnesota Press, 2021. 
艺术与宇宙技术, trans. 苏子滢, Shanghai: East China Normal University Press, 2022.  (Chinese)

Anthologies 

 Fragmentar el futuro: ensayos sobre tecnodiversidad, Buenos Aires: Caja Negra, 2020.  (Spanish)
 Tecnodiversidade, trans. Humberto do Amaral, Sao Paolo: Ubu, 2021.  (Brazilian Portuguese)
 Teknodiversitet, trans. Anders Dunker, Oslo: Existenz Forlag, 2022.  (Norwegian)
 Pensare la Contingenza. La rinascita della filosofia dopo la cibernetica, Rome: Castelvecchi, 2022.  (Italian)
 Technodiverzita, Prague: UMPRUM, 2022. ISBN 9788088308546 (Czech)

Edited volumes 

 Philosophy after Automation, Special Issue of Philosophy Today (Volume 65, Issue 2, Spring 2021) 
 On Cosmotechnics, Special Issue of Angelaki, Vol 25 Issue 4 (August 2020) 
 30 Years after Les Immatériaux: Art, Science and Theory (co-edited with Andreas Broeckmann), Meson Press, 2015. 
 Cosmotechnics For a Renewed Concept of Technology in the Anthropocene (co-edited with Pieter Lemmens), Routledge, 2021.

See also 

Jean-François Lyotard
Mou Zongsan
Philosophy of Technology

References 

Living people
Hong Kong philosophers
Academic staff of the City University of Hong Kong
Philosophers of technology
Year of birth missing (living people)